After Ever Happy (in some countries released as After Ever After or After Forever) is a 2022 American romantic drama film directed by Castille Landon, from a screenplay by Sharon Soboil. Based on the 2015 novel of the same name by Anna Todd, it is a sequel to After We Fell, and the fourth overall installment in the After film series. The film stars Josephine Langford and Hero Fiennes Tiffin, reprising their roles as Tessa Young and Hardin Scott, respectively. The plot continues the premise of the three previous films.

After Ever Happy had its world premiere in London on August 10, 2022, and was released theatrically on September 7, 2022. As with its predecessors, the film received negative reviews from critics. A fifth installment titled After Everything is currently in post-production, while a prequel and an additional sequel centered around the children of the series' main characters are also in development.

Plot
A couple of hours after Christian Vance reveals to Hardin he is Hardin's biological father, Hardin returns to his mother's wedding reception with Tessa, where he confronts her about the deception.  Vance tries to explain himself, but Hardin storms off with a bottle of whiskey. That evening, Tessa finds a drunk Hardin breaking into Trish's house and setting the place on fire. Hardin realizes his mistake and tries to put the fire out, to no avail, but Vance arrives and sneaks Hardin out the back to Tessa's car as the fire department arrives. Hardin wakes up the next morning and Tessa tells him Vance told the police he had set the fire himself. They drive to a hill where they have sex.

Tessa and Hardin return to their hotel where she confides in Kimberley, Vance's fiancee, about her problems dealing with Hardin's anger issues before discovering Hardin has left the hotel. Tessa tracks him down to a party where she finds him drunk and high. She offers him a chance to leave with her, but he declines and she returns to the US. Upon returning to her apartment, Tessa finds her father, dead from an apparent overdose. Landon calls Hardin dozens of times to let him know before he finally picks up. He returns to Tessa and tries to comfort her, but she hides from him. Hardin argues with her mom, Carol, about whether he's good for Tessa and how he always abandons her. 

Still, Hardin, along with Landon, attends Richard's funeral to support Tessa. Hardin and Tessa go to a dinner hosted by Hardin's dad, Ken, and Landon's mom, Karen, along with Landon and his friend, Nora, to say farewell to Landon as he moves to New York for school, where Nora also lives. After dinner, Tessa brings Hardin outside to talk. She tells him they need time apart to heal from their recent family traumas and she's decided to leave Vance Publishing to move to New York with Landon. Hardin is hurt by the bombshell and nearly hits Landon out of rage for not telling him, but Landon reminds him he is also Tessa's friend as much as Hardin is his brother. Tessa gives Hardin an ultimatum that if he loves her, he'll not follow her to New York and let them have their time apart, to which he reluctantly agrees. 

Tessa moves in with Landon and starts working with Nora at a fancy restaurant and Hardin starts going to AA and graduates from university. Months later, Hardin comes to New York for work and Landon offers to host him. Tessa takes double shifts to avoid Hardin, but Landon and Hardin come to her restaurant and request her as their server. Hardin stays until she's off work and they talk about how they've been; Hardin's sobriety and Tessa waiting to get accepted into NYU. Over the next couple of days, they spend time together, slowly reconnecting, during which Landon finally starts a romantic relationship with Nora, much to Hardin and Tessa's happiness.  One night when Landon is at Nora's, Tessa and Hardin give in and have sex again. The next morning after Hardin leaves, Tessa finds a book in his bag, titled "After", documenting their entire relationship. When Hardin returns, Tessa confronts him about the book, not wanting her life to be published for everyone to read about, but Hardin tells her there's already a bidding war for the book. He had read his journal during therapy and a publisher ended up reading it and everything escalated since. Tessa declares that their relationship is officially over.

Sometime later, Hardin's book has been named a New York Times Best Seller. With not many friends at school and Landon having basically moved in with Nora, Tessa reaches out to Robert, Nora's friend, for company. That night, Tessa sneaks into Hardin's book signing without him knowing so she can listen in. She misinterprets a look between Hardin and a woman and as Tessa leaves, Hardin glimpses her.

Cast
 Josephine Langford as Tessa Young
 Hero Fiennes Tiffin as Hardin Scott
 Louise Lombard as Trish Daniels
 Chance Perdomo as Landon Gibson
 Rob Estes as Ken Scott
 Arielle Kebbel as Kimberley
 Stephen Moyer as Christian Vance
 Mira Sorvino as Carol Young
 Frances Turner as Karen Scott 
 Kiana Madeira as Nora
 Jack Bandeira as James
 Carter Jenkins as Robert Freeman

Production

Development
In September 2020, a feature film adaptation of After Ever Happy was announced to be in development. Developed at the same time as After We Fell, the films were announced to be directed by Castille Landon with Sharon Soboil serving as a screenwriter. Josephine Langford and Hero Fiennes-Tiffin were confirmed to reprise their roles as Tessa Young and Hardin Scott, respectively.

Filming
The film entered pre-production in September 2020, prior to the release of After We Collided. Principal photography took place, back-to-back with After We Fell. In December 2021, Louise Lombard, Kiana Madeira, Chance Perdomo, Rob Estes, and Carter Jenkins were confirmed to have reprised their roles from previous movies. The first teaser trailer was released in December 2021.

Photography took place in Bulgaria and wrapped production in December 2020. Landon stated that the novel series' realistic analysis of love, drew her to join the production, stating that her intent while directing the projects was to show that "romance isn't always beautiful". During production, the cast worked closely together and stayed in a hotel in a more isolated manner, while cameras weren't rolling, due to COVID-19 pandemic restrictions and protocols.

Release
A private screening for the film held in London was made public after a featurette with Fiennes-Tiffin was uploaded to YouTube by the film´s Latin American distributor, Diamond Films. The film was later released in the United States on September 7, 2022. Netflix handled distribution, after successfully handling the international release of the previous movie.

Reception

Future
In August 2022, it was announced that production had commenced on a secret sequel to After Ever Happy. Despite having not much revealed, it was stated that principal photography had recently wrapped and that the official title is After Everything. Langford and Fiennes Tiffin are reprising their roles as Tessa Young and Hardin Scott, respectively. It is intended to be the fifth film in the series.

Another sequel and prequel are in development.

References

External links
 

American romantic drama films
2020s English-language films
English-language Netflix original films
Films based on American novels
Films based on young adult literature
Films impacted by the COVID-19 pandemic
Films scored by George Kallis
2022 romantic drama films
Films directed by Castille Landon
2020s American films